"Fairview", also known as the Peerce Home Place, Peerce House, and Rural Retreat, is a historic home and national historic district located near Burlington, Mineral County, West Virginia.  The district includes seven contributing buildings and one contributing site.  The main house was most likely built in the 1860s.  It is a two-story, square brick dwelling with a rectangular wing in a transitional Federal-Greek Revival style.  It has a hipped roof, capped by a cupola and a one-story portico with painted wooden Ionic order columns.  Also on the property are a contributing log cabin (c. 1800) and a number of farm-related outbuildings.

It was listed on the National Register of Historic Places in 1992.

References

Houses on the National Register of Historic Places in West Virginia
Historic districts in Mineral County, West Virginia
Federal architecture in West Virginia
Greek Revival houses in West Virginia
Houses completed in 1833
Houses in Mineral County, West Virginia
National Register of Historic Places in Mineral County, West Virginia
Historic districts on the National Register of Historic Places in West Virginia